Raimundas Palaitis (born 23 October 1957) is a Lithuanian politician. He was a Minister of the Interior from 2008 to 2012.

References

1957 births
Living people
People from Palanga
Ministers of Internal Affairs of Lithuania
Members of the Seimas
21st-century Lithuanian politicians